The 2003–04 season was the 124th season of competitive football by Rangers.

Overview
Rangers played a total of 52 competitive matches during the 2003–04 season.  The season ended trophyless. Due to the club's financial situation they had to resort to selling many top players. These included Barry Ferguson, Lorenzo Amoruso and Neil McCann, they also released high earners Arthur Numan and Bert Konterman.

Despite starting the season well with seven consecutive wins and topping the table, a 1–0 loss at home to Celtic in October saw Rangers season unravel. Inconsistent form and three old firm derby defeats saw Rangers fall behind Celtic in the title race and ended up finishing 17 points off top spot.

The Scottish Cup campaign ended in the third round after a 1–0 defeat to Celtic. The League Cup campaign also ended in defeat at the semi-final stage to Hibernian at Hampden Park, 4–3 on penalties.

In Europe Rangers managed to qualify for the group stages of the 2003–04 UEFA Champions League with a win over F.C. Copenhagen in the third qualifying round.  They were drawn in the group stages alongside English Champions Manchester United, Stuttgart and Panathinaikos.  Despite earning 4 points from the first two matches Rangers were to finish bottom of the group.

Players

Squad information

Transfers

In

Total spending: £1.12m

Out

Total received: £10.5m

Player statistics

Disciplinary record

Club

Board of directors

Coaching staff

Other staff

Matches

Scottish Premier League

UEFA Champions League

Scottish Cup

League Cup

Friendlies

Competitions

Overall

Scottish Premier League

Standings

Results summary

Results by round

References

Rangers F.C. seasons
Rangers